Brünnow may refer to:

 6807 Brünnow, a minor planet
 Franz Brünnow, a German astronomer
 Rudolf Ernst Brünnow (1858–1917), German-American orientalist and philologist